The white-tailed robin (Myiomela leucura) is an Old World flycatcher in the family Muscicapidae.  It ranges across the northern regions of the Indian subcontinent and adjacent areas of Southeast Asia. It is found in Bangladesh, Bhutan, Cambodia, India, Laos, Malaysia, Myanmar, Nepal, Taiwan, Thailand, and Vietnam. Its natural habitats are subtropical or tropical moist lowland forest and subtropical or tropical moist montane forest.

Gallery

References

 BirdLife International 2014.  .   2012 IUCN Red List of Threatened Species.   Accessed on 19 July 2014.

white-tailed robin
Birds of Nepal
Birds of Bhutan
Birds of Northeast India
Birds of China
Birds of Hainan
Birds of Taiwan
Birds of Yunnan
Birds of Southeast Asia
white-tailed robin
Taxonomy articles created by Polbot